Brothers and Sisters is a 1980 British drama film directed by Richard Woolley. It was entered into the 12th Moscow International Film Festival.

Cast
 Carolyn Pickles as Theresa Bennett / Jennifer Collins
 Sam Dale as David Barratt
 Robert East as James Barratt
 Elizabeth Bennett as Sarah Barratt
 Jenifer Armitage as Tricia Snow
 Barry McCarthy as Pete Gibson
 Barrie Shore as Helen Dawson
 Norman Claridge as The Father
 Mavis Pugh as The Mother
 Fred Gaunt as The Detective
 Nick Jensen as Constable
 Jack Platts as Client

References

External links
 

1980 films
1980 drama films
British drama films
Films scored by Trevor Jones
1980s English-language films
1980s British films